The Jewish War or Judean War (in full Flavius Josephus' Books of the History of the Jewish War against the Romans, Phlauiou Iōsēpou historia Ioudaikou polemou pros Rōmaious biblia), also referred to in English as The Wars of the Jews, is a book written by Josephus, a first-century Roman-Jewish historian. It has been described by Steve Mason as "perhaps the most influential non-biblical text of Western history".

Content
Divided into seven books, it opens with a summary of Jewish history from the capture of Jerusalem by the Seleucid ruler Antiochus IV Epiphanes in 168 BC to the first stages of the First Jewish–Roman War (Book I and II). The next five books detail the unfolding of the war, under Roman generals Vespasian and Titus, to the death of the last Sicarii. The book was written about 75 AD, originally in Josephus' "paternal tongue" – either Aramaic or Hebrew – though this version has not survived. It was later translated into Greek, probably under the supervision of Josephus himself. Buth and Pierce wrote "the current Greek edition does not appear to be a translation, but must be considered a new edition, a complete re-working of the first writing and likely a considerable expansion."

The sources of the First Jewish–Roman War are: this account of Josephus, the Talmud (Gittin 57b), Midrash Eichah, and the Hebrew inscriptions on the Jewish coins minted, and Book V of Tacitus' Histories.

The text also survives in an Old Slavonic version, as well as Hebrew which contains material not found in the Greek version, and which is lacking other material found in the Greek version.

Influence
Josephus was a popular writer among Christians in the fourth century and beyond as an independent witness to the events before, during, and after the life of Jesus of Nazareth. Josephus was always accessible in the Greek-reading Eastern Mediterranean. The Jewish War was translated into Latin in the fourth century by Pseudo-Hegesippus in abbreviated form as well as by an unknown other in full, and both versions were widely distributed throughout the Western Roman Empire and its successor states. Christian interest in The Jewish War was largely out of interest in the downfall of the Jews and the Second Temple, which was widely considered divine punishment for the crime of killing Jesus. Improvements in printing technology (the Gutenberg Press) led to the work receiving a number of new translations into the vernacular languages of Europe; the original Greek text was also published in Basel in 1544. In English, the most influential translations were Thomas Lodge's 1602 translation (The Tragic History of the Jews), followed by William Whiston's 1760s translation (The Wars of the Jews).

On the Jewish side, Josephus was far more obscure, as he was perceived as a traitor. Rabbinical writings for a millennium after his death (e.g. the Mishnah) almost never call out Josephus by name, although they sometimes tell parallel tales of the same events that Josephus narrated. An Italian Jew writing in the 10th century indirectly brought Josephus back to prominence among Jews: he authored the Yosippon, which paraphrases Pseudo-Hegesippus's Latin version of The Jewish War (among other works), and included additional historical snippets at times. Jews generally distrusted Christian translations of Josephus until the 19th century, when sufficiently "neutral" vernacular language translations were made. Kalman Schulman finally created a translation of the Greek text of Josephus into Hebrew in 1863, although many rabbis continued to prefer the Yosippon version. By the 20th century, Jewish attitudes toward Josephus had softened, as Jews found parts of The Jewish War inspiring and favorable to the Jews. The last stand at Masada was seen as inspirational rather than tragic, for example. A 1938 / 1941 play, Jerusalem and Rome, was loosely based on The Jewish War, and various novels were written. These 20th century interpretations inevitably reflected the concerns of the era, unsurprisingly, such as the persecution of Jews in Russia and Nazi-era Europe, the nascent Zionist movement, and the situation of Jewish settlers in the British Mandate of Palestine.

For scholars, Josephus is and remains an invaluable resource for study of the Jewish-Roman war. While he is clearly deferential toward his Flavian dynasty Roman patrons, he is generally considered a relatively neutral source. Archaeological finds have found contradictions with some of his claims, but often for understandable reasons. Most of Josephus' narratives in The Jewish War are considered at least a good start for determining historical events and to be reasonably reliable.

References

Literature
 The Jewish War: Revised Edition. .
 H. Leeming and K. Leeming: "Josephus' 'Jewish War' and Its Slavonic Version: A Synoptic Comparison." Ancient Judaism & Early Christianity, Brill (1999). .

External links

 Resources > Second Temple and Talmudic Era > Flavius Josephus The Jewish History Resource Center – Project of the Dinur Center for Research in Jewish History, The Hebrew University of Jerusalem
 , William Whiston translation
 
 The Wars of the Jews at the Perseus Project, W. Whiston translation
 Original Greek edition.
 Notes on the Old Slavonic Josephus
 Hear a discussion and analysis of this monograph, on an episode of the radio series Invitation to Learning.
 Loeb Classical Library Josephus Volume 2 The Jewish War Books 1–3, H. St. J. Thackeray translation
 Loeb Classical Library Josephus Volume 3 The Jewish War Books 4–7

1st-century history books
70s
Jews and Judaism in the Roman Empire
Judaism and warfare
Works by Josephus
Ancient Greek military books
First Jewish–Roman War